The Tage ("Tagus") was a 100-gun  of the French Navy.

Service history
She was laid down as Polyphème in 1824, renamed Saint Louis, and eventually Tage. She was launched only in 1847.. On 12 February 1855, she ran aground in the Kamiesch, in the Crimea. She was refloated. From 1857 to 1858, she was converted to steam ship.

After 1871, she was used as a prison ship to hold insurgents of the Commune of Paris. Later she ferried prisoners to New Caledonia.

She served as a hulk before being scrapped in 1896.

References

External links 

 100-guns ships of the line
le Tage - blog of Bernard Guinard

Ships of the line of the French Navy
Ships built in France
Prison ships
Crimean War naval ships of France
1847 ships
Hercule-class ships of the line
Paris Commune
Maritime incidents in February 1855